This is a list of mayors of Gary, Indiana. The first mayor, Thomas Knotts, served as Town Board president from 1906 to 1909, when Gary officially became a city. Every mayor since 1943 has served as a member of the Democratic Party.

References

External links
List of mayors by G. David Yaros

Mayors of Gary, Indiana
Gary, Indiana